Balehosur  is a village in the Lakshmeshwar taluk of Gadag district in the Indian state of Karnataka.

Demographics
 India census, Balehosur had a population of 5347 with 2802 males and 2545 females.

Importance
Balehosur is famous for Sri Dingaleshwara Mata and Historical Northfacing Maruti temple located in the village. Devotees from all over the region participate in the annual Jatra festival held at the end of April.

Transport
Balehosur is well connected by road network to Lakshmeshwar and Savanur.  Balehosur is 22 km from Taluka headquarters  Lakshmeshwar.

See also 
 Shishuvinahala
 Shigli
 Gudgeri
 Kalasa, Kundgol
 Kundgol
 Gadag

References

External links 
 https://web.archive.org/web/20090409224557/http://gadag.nic.in/

Villages in Gadag district